The Writ De Excommunicato Capiendo Act 1562 (5 Eliz 1 c 23) was an Act of the Parliament of England.

The whole Act was repealed by section 87 of, and Schedule 5 to, the Ecclesiastical Jurisdiction Measure 1963.

Writ
A writ de excommunicato capiendo (Latin for "taking one who is excommunicated") was a writ commanding the sheriff to arrest one who was excommunicated, and imprison him till he should become reconciled to the church.

See also
De Excommunicato Deliberando

References
Halsbury's Statutes,

Acts of the Parliament of England (1485–1603)
1562 in law
1562 in England
Ecclesiastical writs